Rock paper scissors is a fair choosing method between two people.

Rock, Paper, Scissors may also refer to:

 Rock, Paper, Scissors (2012 film), a Venezuelan drama film
 Rock Paper Scissors (2013 film), a Canadian thriller film
 Rock, Paper, Scissors (2017 film), an American psychological thriller film
 Rock Paper Scissors (album), a 2008 album by Noah23

See also 
 Scissors, Paper, Rock!, a 2008 album by The Axis of Awesome